Dick Hannula is a swimming coach in Tacoma, Washington who coached for Tacoma Swim Club, also known as TSC. During his time coaching, his students won 24 consecutive state championships, a total of 323 swim meets with no loss. In 1980, he was chosen as the National High School Swim Coach of the Year, was a 1987 Honor Coach in the International Swimming Hall of Fame, and in 1990 was the commissioner of swimming for the Goodwill Games. A four-term president of the National Swimming Association, he coached the US National Swim Team in 1973, 1975 (in the Pan American Games), 1976, 1978, and 1985.  He managed the national swim team in 1979, at the 1984 Summer Olympics and the 1988 Summer Olympics. A member of the International Swimming Hall of Fame, Hannula became the assistant coach for The University of Puget Sound's men's and women's swim teams in the 2007-2008 season and coaches for Tacoma Swim Club on a regular basis.  He resides in North Tacoma with his wife, Sylvia. He has four children. Hannula is of Finnish and Austrian origin.

Hannula is the inventor of Han's Paddles, the first "holed" paddles.

See also
 List of members of the International Swimming Hall of Fame

References

American male swimmers
Sportspeople from Tacoma, Washington
University of Puget Sound
American people of Austrian descent
American people of Finnish descent
American swimming coaches
College swimming coaches in the United States
Living people
Year of birth missing (living people)
Place of birth missing (living people)